Dodartia is a genus of flowering plants in the family Mazaceae. It has only one currently accepted species, Dodartia orientalis, native to Ukraine, Russia, Anatolia, the Caucasus, Central Asia, Iran, Afghanistan, Pakistan, the Altai, northern China and Mongolia. A weedy perennial, it is eaten by saiga antelope.

References

Mazaceae
Monotypic Lamiales genera
Plants described in 1753
Taxa named by Carl Linnaeus